South Dakota Highway 115 (SD 115) is a  state highway in Lincoln and Minnehaha countess in South Dakota, United States, that was created from the routing of US 77, "Old 77", when its alignment was moved west to become Interstate 29 around 1980 and SD 15's route from US 18 to Sioux Falls.

SD 115 was designated a POW/MIA Memorial Highway in 2000. The segment south of Sioux Falls to US 18 was originally designated part of the Custer Battlefield Highway when it was designated SD 15.

Route description

South Dakota Highway 115 begins at an intersection with US 18 west of Canton and heads due north through rural Lincoln County. The highway runs just east of Worthing and about a mile west of Harrisburg, South Dakota. Three miles north of the Harrisburg intersection, SD 115 intersects 85th Street and enters Sioux Falls from the south. It runs along Minnesota Avenue in the southern portion of Sioux Falls and enters Minnehaha County upon crossing 57th Street. Just south of 41st Street, SD 115 meets Interstate 229. SD 115 travels farther north through the downtown section of Sioux Falls, meeting SD 42 eastbound at 11th Street and westbound at 10th Street. North of downtown Sioux Falls, the route turns east on Benson Road, then north again on Cliff Avenue. It then meets Interstate 90 just before exiting Sioux Falls.

North of Sioux Falls, SD 115 travels through rural, sparsely populated areas of Minnehaha County. It passes through Renner and east of Baltic before entering Dell Rapids. In Dell Rapids, the highway turns west at 4th Street and travels about three miles west to its terminus at Interstate 29.

Major intersections

See also

 List of state highways in South Dakota

References

External links

 Unofficial SD Highway Website

115
Transportation in Sioux Falls, South Dakota
Transportation in Lincoln County, South Dakota
Transportation in Minnehaha County, South Dakota
U.S. Route 77